The Other Side is the fourth full-length album by the German metal band Farmer Boys. Unlike their previous albums, this album has no reference to farm animals or farm life at all. A music video for "Stay Like This Forever" was made and it was released on the Monsters of Metal Vol. 2 DVD.

Track listing

Personnel

Farmer Boys 
 Matthias Sayer – vocals
 Alexander Scholpp – guitars
 Dennis Hummel – programming
 Antonio Ieva – bass
 Till Hartmann – drums

Production 
 Bernhard Hahn – engineer
 Dan Diamond – mix producer, mixing
 Siggi Bemm – mix engineer, mastering
 Dennis Köhne – mix engineer

2004 albums
Farmer Boys (band) albums
Nuclear Blast albums